George Philip Barber (26 March 1863 – 7 November 1938) was a member of the Queensland Legislative Assembly. To the people of Bundaberg, he was known as "Honest George".

Biography
Barber was born in Oulton Broad, a suburb of Lowestoft in Suffolk, the son of George Barber Snr and his wife Susan (née Gall). He was educated in the local parish and board schools and by 1875 was working as a seaman in the Dogger Bank fishing fleet before engaging in missionary work in India.

After arriving in Queensland Barber took up banana farming and was a handyman at the local meatworks and labourer at a sawmill. He was also a Petty Officer in the Royal Australian Naval Reserve for the duration of World War I.

In 1891 Barber married Mary Nichols (died 1939) in Melbourne and together had two sons and two daughters. He died in Brisbane in November 1938 and was cremated at Mt Thompson Crematorium.

Public career
Following the resignation of Thomas Glassey to join the Australian Senate, Barber, a member of the Labour Party, won the resulting by-election in 1901 for the seat of Bundaberg in the Queensland Legislative Assembly. He defeated Michael Duffy, who had represented the seat from 1893 to 1896.

Barber went on to represent the seat for 34 years, retiring at the 1935 state election. By the time of his retirement he was the Father of the House. For a period during his parliamentary career, Barber was Secretary of the Queensland Parliamentary Labor Party.

References

Members of the Queensland Legislative Assembly
1863 births
1938 deaths
Australian Labor Party members of the Parliament of Queensland